The Shadow Ministry of Bob Hawke was the opposition Australian Labor Party shadow ministry of Australia from 8 February 1983 to 11 March 1983, opposing Malcolm Fraser's Coalition ministry.

The shadow cabinet is a group of senior Opposition spokespeople who form an alternative Cabinet to the government's, whose members shadow or mark each individual Minister or portfolio of the Government.

Bob Hawke became Leader of the Opposition upon his election as leader of the Australian Labor Party on 8 February 1983, and appointed a Shadow Cabinet. The Shadow Ministry never sat in Parliament, having spent the entirety of its short existence in the election campaign which Labor won.

Shadow Ministry
The following were members of the Shadow Cabinet:

See also
 Shadow Ministry of Bill Hayden
 First Hawke Ministry
 Fourth Fraser Ministry

References

Australian Labor Party
Hawke
Opposition of Australia